Lee Sang-yeol (born 9 March 1966) is a South Korean volleyball player. He competed in the men's tournament at the 1988 Summer Olympics.

References

1966 births
Living people
South Korean men's volleyball players
Olympic volleyball players of South Korea
Volleyball players at the 1988 Summer Olympics
Place of birth missing (living people)
Asian Games medalists in volleyball
Asian Games silver medalists for South Korea
Volleyball players at the 1990 Asian Games
Medalists at the 1990 Asian Games
20th-century South Korean people